Toni Estes is an American singer-songwriter and background vocalist best known for co-writing Whitney Houston's 1999 hit single "It's Not Right but It's Okay", as well as her other work with producer Rodney "Darkchild" Jerkins. In 2000, Estes released her solo debut album "Two Eleven".

Discography
Studio albums
 Two Eleven (2000)

Songwriting and vocal credits

Credits are courtesy of Spotify, Discogs and AllMusic.

Awards and nominations

References 

Living people
African-American songwriters
American rhythm and blues singer-songwriters
Year of birth missing (living people)